Lancaster is a city in and the county seat of Grant County, Wisconsin, United States. The population was 3,907 at the 2020 census.

History
Lancaster originated as a planned community to serve as the county seat for Grant County. Anticipating the county's establishment in 1836, Major Glendower M. Price, a Cassville merchant and land speculator, purchased the site of Lancaster for its central location in the county. Major Price platted the town on a compass-aligned grid in 1837, reserving a large central square for the new county government. He was persuaded to name the city Lancaster by a relative who migrated from Lancaster, Pennsylvania.  Maj. Price and Daniel Banfill contracted to construct the first county courthouse, which stood on the square from 1838-1851. A second courthouse was constructed in 1852-1853 and enlarged in 1865. The present, third courthouse was constructed on the site in 1902.

Pleasant Ridge, one of the first African-American communities in Wisconsin, was founded just outside Lancaster by the Shepard family in 1849 and settled in the 1850s. Lancaster was the home of the first governor of Wisconsin, Nelson Dewey.

Geography
Lancaster is located at  (42.848505, −90.710430). Lancaster is located in the unglaciated "Driftless Area" of southwest Wisconsin whose topography is strikingly different from that of the rest of the state.

Demographics

2020 census
As of the census of 2020, the population was 3,907. The racial makeup of the city was 95.3% White, 0.8% Black or African American, 0.5% Asian, 0.5% from other races, and 2.8% from two or more races. Ethnically, the population was 1.4% Hispanic or Latino of any race.

2010 census
As of the census of 2010, there were 3,868 people, 1,659 households, and 1,037 families living in the city. The racial makeup of the city was 98.3% White, 0.5% African American, 0.2% Native American, 0.5% Asian, 0.3% from other races, and 0.3% from two or more races. Hispanic or Latino of any race were 0.8% of the population.

There were 1,659 households, of which 28.3% had children under the age of 18 living with them, 49.1% were married couples living together, 9.3% had a female householder with no husband present, 4.0% had a male householder with no wife present, and 37.5% were non-families. 32.4% of all households were made up of individuals, and 16.6% had someone living alone who was 65 years of age or older. The average household size was 2.27 and the average family size was 2.87.

The median age in the city was 41.2 years. 23.6% of residents were under the age of 18; 7.4% were between the ages of 18 and 24; 23.1% were from 25 to 44; 26.1% were from 45 to 64; and 19.8% were 65 years of age or older. The gender makeup of the city was 47.4% male and 52.6% female.

2000 census
As of the census of 2000, there were 4,070 people, 1,706 households, and 1,079 families living in the city. The population density was 1,441.1 people per square mile (557.2/km2). There were 1,799 housing units at an average density of 637.0 per square mile (246.3/km2). The racial makeup of the city was 99.24% White, 0.07% African American, 0.29% Asian, 0.10% from other races, and 0.29% from two or more races. Hispanic or Latino of any race were 0.42% of the population.

There were 1,706 households, out of which 28.3% had children under the age of 18 living with them, 52.8% were married couples living together, 8.0% had a female householder with no husband present, and 36.7% were non-families. 31.8% of all households were made up of individuals, and 18.1% had someone living alone who was 65 years of age or older. The average household size was 2.31 and the average family size was 2.93.

In the city, the population was spread out, with 23.5% under the age of 18, 9.0% from 18 to 24, 25.1% from 25 to 44, 21.9% from 45 to 64, and 20.5% who were 65 years of age or older. The median age was 40 years. For every 100 females, there were 89.3 males. For every 100 females age 18 and over, there were 87.0 males.

The median income for a household in the city was $32,723, and the median income for a family was $47,500. Males had a median income of $30,683 versus $22,331 for females. The per capita income for the city was $17,797. About 6.4% of families and 8.9% of the population were below the poverty line, including 8.9% of those under age 18 and 9.7% of those age 65 or over.

Transportation

Airports
Lancaster Municipal Airport (73C) serves the city and surrounding communities.

Major highways
  U.S. Route 61 ("Madison Street"), passes north–south through the center of the city.
  Highway 29, bypasses the city to the east.
  County Trunk Highway A, passes east–west through the center of the city.

Education
Lancaster Community School District is the public school district for the community. The town also has a Catholic school.

Architecture

Lancaster calls itself "The City of the Dome" after the octagonal glass and copper-clad dome of its courthouse, which was designed by Armand Koch and built in 1905. In the spandrels of the courthouse dome are four allegorical murals painted by Franz Edward Rohrbeck.

The Municipal Building (1922) is an example of Prairie School early modern architecture, which, like the courthouse, has been placed on the National Register of Historic Places.

The L. J. Arthur House, noted for its architecture, is also listed on the National Register.

The Lancaster Post Office contains a Depression-era mural, painted under the Works Progress Administration program in 1940.

The stone and wood Patrick and Margaret Kinney House in Lancaster was designed by Frank Lloyd Wright, one of 45 Wright structures in Wisconsin.

Notable people

 J. Allen Barber – lawyer, U.S. Representative 1871–75; lived and died in Lancaster
 George Barnett – Commandant of the United States Marine Corps
 Charles H. Baxter – Wisconsin State Senator
 Lisle Blackbourn – NFL head coach
 John Benton Callis – U.S. Representative from Alabama
 William Carter – Wisconsin State Representative
 John G. Clark (1825-1917) - Associate Justice of Oklahoma Territory Supreme Court (1898-1903), returned to Lancaster for the rest of his life
 Nelson Dewey – first Governor of Wisconsin; lived in Lancaster
 Hugh A. Harper – Wisconsin State Representative
 John Chandler Holloway – President Pro Tem of the Wisconsin State Senate
 A. H. Kemper – South Dakota politician
 William John McCoy – Wisconsin State Representative
 Thomas McDonald, Jr. – Wisconsin State Representative
 Joseph Trotter Mills – Wisconsin State Representative
 Roger P. Murphy – Wisconsin State Senator and jurist
 Carson Abel Roberts – U.S. Marine Corps Lieutenant General
 Dave Schreiner – member of the College Football Hall of Fame
 David Schreiner – Wisconsin State Representative
 Reuben B. Showalter – Wisconsin State Representative
 William Simon U'Ren – Oregon politician
 Arthur W. Worth – Wisconsin State Representative

See also
 List of cities in Wisconsin

References

External links

 
 Sanborn fire insurance maps: 1894 1899 1905 1912

Cities in Wisconsin
Cities in Grant County, Wisconsin
County seats in Wisconsin
Populated places established in 1837
1837 establishments in Wisconsin Territory